The Corps of Cadets at the United States Military Academy (USMA), at West Point, New York, is organized into a brigade. The senior ranking cadet, the brigade commander, is known traditionally as the first captain, a leadership position created in 1872. The first captain is responsible for the overall performance of the 4,400-strong Corps of Cadets, including the implementing of a class agenda and acting as a liaison between the corps and the administration.

The rigid screening process begins with the applications for enrollment being submitted to either Federal-level legislators, or to the president or vice president of the United States. Once enrolled at the academy, each student's performance is closely tracked through the first three years, at the end of which, the individual top-performing cadet is named first captain for the ensuing academic year. Among the notable historical figures who held that position were John J. Pershing, Douglas MacArthur, and William Westmoreland.

During the academy's first 174 years, only men were admitted, with Henry Ossian Flipper in 1877 being the first African-American graduate. Vincent K. Brooks in 1980 was the first African American to hold the rank of first captain, and John Tien, who became the Deputy Secretary of the United States Department of Homeland Security in 2021, was the first Asian American to serve as first captain, in 1987. The first woman selected as first captain was Kristin M. Baker in 1989, and Simone Askew became the first African American woman first captain in 2018. Lauren Drysdale, a native of Irvine, California, is the 2022–2023 first captain.

Background
The United States Military Academy was founded in 1802, through the Military Peace Establishment Act signed into law by President Thomas Jefferson. The legislation served the dual purpose of maintaining a well-trained standing militia at the ready, and of bringing to fruition Jefferson's vision of a national university. During the academy's first 174 years, only men were admitted, with Henry Ossian Flipper in 1877 being the first African-American graduate. Public Law 94-106 (89 Stat. 531), signed by President Gerald Ford on 7 October 1975, mandated the admission of women at all of the previously male-only United States military service academies.  On 7 July 1976, the first 119 women were admitted as students to West Point.

The school is one of three officer-training United States service academies under the jurisdiction of the Department of Defense, which sets the criteria for the applicants. The other two schools are the United States Naval Academy and the United States Air Force Academy. Applications for admission to any of the three schools are submitted to the offices of the United States president and vice president, as well as to congressional and senatorial representatives.

Selection and organization of the Cadet Corps
The USMA academic year runs 12 calendar months, beginning in mid-May of one year, with class graduation taking place in May the following year. Class of 2023 began 16 May 2022, with the scheduled graduation date of 27 May 2023.

Each academic year, West Point announces its selection of cadet leadership positions. On 26 July 2021,  Brigadier General Mark Quander, the current Commandant of Cadets, announced the Class of 2022 selections:

The corps of cadets of each academic year is organized into a brigade with four regiments. Within each regiment there are three battalions, each consisting of three companies. Companies are lettered A through I, with a number signifying which regiment it belongs to. For example, there are four "H" companies: H1, H2, H3, and H4. The first captain is responsible for the overall performance of the 4,400-strong Corps of Cadets, including the implementing of a class agenda and acting as a liaison between the Corps and the administration. The names of first captains are displayed on plaques outside the Eisenhower Barracks.

Influence
Several have risen to high rank and historical importance. John J. Pershing was 1886 first captain. With a goal of being a lawyer, he applied for enrollment to receive a tuition-free education. Prior to West Point, he taught at an all-black school in Laclede, Missouri. Known also as "Black Jack Pershing", some sources attribute the nickname to his rigid leadership style, while others attribute it to his 1895 command of the all-black "Buffalo Soldier" 10th Cavalry Regiment. In 1916, he led 10,000 men on an excursion into Mexico attempting to capture revolutionary general Pancho Villa. On 13 June 1917, Pershing was put in charge of the World War I American Expeditionary Forces in Europe, and was one of the architects of the Treaty of Versailles. He was promoted in 1919 to General of the Armies of the United States, at that time, the highest US Army rank ever achieved.

Charles Pelot Summerall was named first captain in 1892. He later participated in the Philippine Insurrection and the China Relief Expedition. Summerall was in France during World War I at Cantigny, Soissons, Battle of Saint-Mihiel, and in the Meuse-Argonne. He was a member of the 1919 American Commission to Negotiate Peace. His final position before retirement at age 86 was as president of The Citadel military college (1931–1953).

1903 first captain Douglas MacArthur became a five-star General of the Army, as well as Supreme Commander for the Allied Powers. Both MacArthur and 1906 first captain Jonathan M. Wainwright were awarded the Medal of Honor for their services in the Philippines campaign during World War II. In a public disagreement with President Harry S. Truman's policies during the Korean War, MacArthur was relieved of his command on 11 April 1951, but remained popular with the American public and was invited to deliver a farewell address before the United States Congress. He was 82 years old and in failing health when accepting the Sylvanus Thayer Award at the academy:

  

Pershing, MacArthur, Malin Craig, William Westmoreland and Bernard W. Rogers all served as Chief of Staff of the United States Army. John P. McConnell became first captain in 1938, and the Chief of Staff of the United States Air Force in 1964.

Interrupted terms
There were some unusual cases. Casper H. Conrad Jr. was selected as first captain of the Class of 1894 on 14 August 1893, but he went off limits during a cadet visit to the World's Columbian Exposition in Chicago. He was court martialed and dismissed from the academy but was permitted to return the following year and graduated with the Class of 1895. He was removed as first captain on 24 August 1893 before the start of the Academic year and never served in the position. There were two first captains in the Class of 1920 because Claude M. McQuarrie resigned the post in order to concentrate on his academic studies. Thomas A. Roberts Jr. was named as his successor for the remainder of the academic year.

First captains (1872–present)

See also
History of the United States Military Academy
The class the stars fell on

Notes

References

External links
West Point cadet corp general information
West Point graduate scholarship program

Academy alumni, First Captains
First Captains
West Point First Captains
West Point First Captains
West Point First Captains